Jordan Brian Brown (born 21 June 2001) is an English footballer who plays as a defender or midfielder for Leyton Orient.

Career
Brown made his debut for Derby County as a substitute in a 2–0 away defeat to West Bromwich Albion on 8 July 2020.

On 24 January 2022, Brown signed an 18-month contract with EFL League Two side Leyton Orient.

Career statistics

References

2001 births
Living people
English footballers
Association football defenders
Association football midfielders
Derby County F.C. players
Leyton Orient F.C. players
English Football League players